David Alistair Yalof  is a political scientist and university administrator.  On January 1, 2023, he became the Vice Provost for Academic Affairs at William & Mary. He formerly served as professor and department head of the political science department at the University of Connecticut, where he specialized in constitutional law, judicial politics and executive branch politics. His books include Pursuit of Justices (1999), which NBC News called "the definitive book on post-World War II Supreme Court nominees".

Books
1999: Pursuit of Justices: Presidential Politics and the Selection of Supreme Court Nominees, (Chicago: University of Chicago Press, 1999). The book was the winner of the APSA's Richard E. Neustadt Prize for the Best Book on the Presidency published in 1999.
2002: The First Amendment and the Media in the Court of Public Opinion with Kenneth Dautrich (Cambridge: Cambridge University Press, 2002)
2007: Constitutional Law: Civil Liberty and Individual Rights, 6th Edition with William Cohen and David Danelski (St. Paul, Minn.: West, 2007)
2008: The Future of the First Amendment: The Digital Media, Civic Education and Free Expression Rights in America's High Schools with Kenneth Dautrich and Mark Hugo Lopez (Rowman & Littlefield, 2008)
2012: Prosecution Among Friends: Presidents, Attorneys General, and Executive Branch Wrongdoing (College Station, Tex.: Texas A&M University Press, 2012).
2017: Enduring Democracy: An Introduction to American Government with Kenneth Dautrich and Christina Bejarano (Belmont, Cal.: Cengage, 2008, 2009, 2011, 2013, 2015, 2017)''

References

External links
Faculty page at University of Connecticut

American political writers
American male non-fiction writers
Living people
Year of birth missing (living people)